Jalel Duranti (born 4 April 1994) is an Italian former road cyclist. He most notably won the road race at the 2018 Mediterranean Games.

Major results
2012
 6th Trofeo comune di Vertova
2018
 1st  Road race, Mediterranean Games
 2nd Gran Premio San Giuseppe
 6th Coppa della Pace
2019
 1st Stages 2 & 6

References

External links
 

1994 births
Living people
Italian male cyclists
Cyclists from the Province of Cremona
Mediterranean Games gold medalists for Italy
Mediterranean Games medalists in cycling
Competitors at the 2018 Mediterranean Games
People from Soncino